Sankt Jørgensbjerg is a district of Roskilde on the Danish island of Zealand. Initially a fishing village in its own right with a history dating back to the Viking era, it became part of Roskilde in 1938. Today it has become the most desirable district in the city.

Notable people
 L.A. Ring (1854-1933), painter
 Sigrid Ring, née Kähler, ceramist and painter

See also
St Jørgensbjerg Church

References

Roskilde
Neighbourhoods in Denmark
Urban planning in Denmark